Verkhneye Zapolye is a rural locality (a village) in Krasnovishersky District, Perm Krai, Russia. The population was 3 as of 2010. There is 1 street.

Geography 
Verkhneye Zapolye is located 55 km southeast of Krasnovishersk (the district's administrative centre) by road. Arefina is the nearest rural locality.

References 

Rural localities in Krasnovishersky District